General de Jesus College (GJC), formerly known as General de Jesus Academy, is a private school located in the Poblacion, San Isidro, Nueva Ecija, the Philippines.  It was founded in 1946.

References

External links 
 

Universities and colleges in Nueva Ecija
Educational institutions established in 1946
1946 establishments in the Philippines